Alan Sanford Prince (born 1946) is a Board of Governors Professor Emeritus of Linguistics at Rutgers University-New Brunswick.  Prince, along with Paul Smolensky, developed Optimality Theory, which was originally applied to phonology, but has been extended to other areas of linguistics such as syntax and semantics.

Biography
Prince went to high school in Fairfax, Virginia, got his BA with "great distinction" from McGill University, and received his PhD from MIT in 1975. Before coming to Rutgers, he was a professor of linguistics at Brandeis University and at the University of Massachusetts Amherst. In 2010 Prince was named the Rutgers Board of Governors Professor of Linguistics. He became an Emeritus Professor at Rutgers in 2015 upon his retirement. The "Short 'schrift for Alan Prince" was assembled for this occasion, and presented to him at the 2015 Rutgers Typology Workshop.

Prince is married to Jane Grimshaw, who is a Distinguished Professor of Linguistics at Rutgers University.

Awards
In 1998, Prince was named a fellow of the John Simon Guggenheim Memorial Foundation.

Key Publications
A. Prince, P. Smolensky. 2008. Optimality Theory: Constraint interaction in generative grammar

J.J. McCarthy, A. Prince. 1995. Faithfulness and reduplicative identity.

J.J. McCarthy, A. Prince. 1993 Generalized alignment. Springer.
 
S. Pinker, A. Prince. 1988.  On language and connectionism: Analysis of a parallel distributed processing model of language acquisition
Cognition.

A. Prince, 1983. Relating to the grid. Linguistic Inquiry.

M. Liberman, A. Prince. 1977. On stress and linguistic rhythm. Linguistic Inquiry

References

External links
 Homepage at Rutgers

Linguists from the United States
American phonologists
1946 births
Living people
People from Fairfax, Virginia
Fellows of the Cognitive Science Society